RTFC may refer to one of the following British association football clubs:

 Radstock Town F.C.
 Raunds Town F.C.
 Reading Town F.C.
 Rhayader Town F.C.
 Rhuddlan Town F.C.
 Ringwood Town F.C.
 Rochdale Town F.C.
 Romsey Town F.C.
 Ross Town F.C.
 Rotherham Town F.C. (disambiguation)
 Rothwell Town F.C.
 Royston Town F.C.
 Rugby Town F.C.
 Ruthin Town F.C.